Mỹ Phú Đông is a rural commune of Thoại Sơn District in An Giang Province, Vietnam.

References

Communes of An Giang province
Populated places in An Giang province